Natshinnaung (1579–1613) was a Toungoo prince who was a noted poet and an accomplished musician, as well as an able military commander. He later became a rebellious ruler of Toungoo, and went over to ally himself with Portuguese at Thanlyin (Syriam). He was crucified and executed in 1613.

Brief
A grandson of King Bayinnaung and the eldest son of Minye Thihathu, Viceroy of Toungoo, the prince participated in King Nanda's campaigns to reconquer Siam in the early 1590s, and took part in the sacking of Nanda's capital Pegu in 1599. Natshinnaung became Crown prince of Toungoo when his father proclaimed himself the king of Toungoo. In November 1600, he killed the captive king Nanda without his father's permission. On , he married his lifelong love, Princess Yaza Datu Kalaya, for whom his famous poems were written. The marriage was cut short however as the princess died only seven months later.

When Natshinnaung succeeded as king following the death of his father on 11 August 1609, much of the country had been reunited under the leadership of King Anaukpetlun, one of Natshinnaung's cousins. In 1610, Anaukpetlun attacked Toungoo. The city surrendered on 4 September 1610 (2nd waning of Tawthalin 972 ME). Although the king re-appointed him as viceroy of Toungoo, Natshinnaung was deeply dissatisfied with his reduced status. Natshinnaung secretly made an alliance with Portuguese mercenary Filipe de Brito e Nicote, the ruler of Thanlyin, and invited de Brito to attack Toungoo. When de Brito's attack failed, Natshinnaung accompanied his "blood brother" de Brito back to Thanlyin.

Anaukpetlun finally captured Thanlyin in April 1613 after a month-long siege. The king still offered to pardon his cousin if Natshinnaung would take an oath of allegiance. Natshinnaung refused, saying that he had already taken baptism, and that he was ready to die with de Brito.Therefore, Natshinnaung and Filipe De Brito were crucified  in the middle of the city, and executed by impaling them.

Poet
Natshinnaung is considered by many to be the greatest yadu (a classical genre of poetry) poet in Burmese history. Many of his works are dedicated to Princess Yaza Datu Kalyani. The themes of his poetry were often of love, nature, and war. Natshinnaung employed the use of vocabulary and rhymes in his works. In addition, he was a warrior, who advanced many military strategies and tactics of Burma. Some of his yadu poems describe the infantry and the elephant troops. It has been claimed that Natshinnaung sent his poems to Yaza Datu Kalyani through the usage of a parrot. He wrote all of his works during his youth.

Later in life, Natshinnaung focused on obtaining power for his kingdom. His poems on war are said to have been based on his experiences as a young prince.

Ancestry

Notes

References

Bibliography
 
 
 
 

1579 births
1613 deaths
Burmese Roman Catholics
Burmese monarchs
Converts to Roman Catholicism from Buddhism
Rulers of Toungoo
Burmese princes
Executed monarchs
Monarchs taken prisoner in wartime
Burmese male poets